Carl Walter Richter (September 23, 1887 – October 3, 1918) was a German gymnast who competed in the 1912 Summer Olympics. He was born in Leipzig. In 1912 he was a member of the German team which finished fourth in the team, free system competition and fifth in the team, European system event.

References

1887 births
1918 deaths
German male artistic gymnasts
Olympic gymnasts of Germany
Gymnasts at the 1912 Summer Olympics
Sportspeople from Leipzig